Alexander Grigorev or Aleksandr Grigoryev (born 10 November 1989) is a Russian judoka.

He is the gold medalist of the 2016 Judo Grand Prix Zagreb in the -90 kg category.

References

External links
 

1989 births
Living people
Russian male judoka
21st-century Russian people